Bird, also known as A Bird in Flight refers to bird-like mathematical artworks that are introduced by mathematical equations. A group of these figures are created by combing through tens of thousands of computer-generated images. They are usually defined by trigonometric functions. An example of A Bird in Flight is made up of 500 segments defined in a Cartesian plane where for each  the endpoints of the -th line segment are:
 

and

 .

The 500 line segments defined above together form a shape in the Cartesian plane that resembles a bird with open wings. Looking at the line segments on the wings of the bird causes an optical illusion and may trick the viewer into thinking that the segments are curved lines. Therefore, the shape can also be considered as an optical artwork.  Another version of A Bird in Flight was defined as the union of all of the circles with center  and radius , where , and
 
 
 
The set of the 20,001 circles defined above form a subset of the plane that resembles a flying bird. Although this version's equations are a lot more complicated than the version made of 500 segments, it has a better resemblance to a real flying bird.

References 

Birds in art
Mathematical artworks
Contemporary works of art
Geometric shapes